The Cocoa Astros were a professional minor league baseball team in the Florida State League (FSL), as a Class A affiliate with the Houston Astros from 1965–72 and 1977. The team played at the Astros' spring training facility. The Cocoa FSL team was first known as the Cocoa Indians (1951–58) when formed in 1951. The Indians won the Florida State League title in 1956 with a 90-50 record.

The ballparks
The Cocoa Astros played at the Cocoa Expo Sports Center located at 500 Friday Road. The facility was originally built in 1964 for the Houston Colt .45's use during Spring training.
The Indians played at the Ball Fields at 1450 Minuteman Causeway.

Notable alumni

 Bruce Bochy (1977) 1996 NL Manager of the Year:MGR: 3 × World Series Champion (2010, 2012, 2014) – S.F. Giants
 Jim Pankovits (1977)
 Joe Pittman (1977)
 Gary Rajsich (1977)
 Bert Roberge (1977)
 Dave Smith (1977) 2 x MLB All-Star; 
 Paul Siebert (1972)
 John McLaren (1972) 
 Jimy Williams (1972 MGR) 1999 AL Manager of the Year
 Jackie Brandt (1970)
 Mike Cosgrove (1970–71)
 Mike Easler (1970–71) MLB All-Star 
 Stan Papi (1970–71)
 J. R. Richard (1970) MLB All-Star ; 1979 NL ERA Leader; 2 × NL Strikeout Leader (1978, 1979)
 Derrel Thomas (1969)
 Oscar Zamora (1969)
 Cesar Cedeno (1968)  4 x MLB All-Star 
 John Mayberry (1968) 2 x MLB All-Star 
 Leo Posada (1968–69, Player/MGR)
 Ed Acosta (1967–68)
 Ed Armbrister (1967–68)
 Enzo Hernández (1967)
 Cliff Johnson (1967–68)
 Scipio Spinks (1967)
 Roric Harrison (1966) 
 Bob Watson (1966) 2 x MLB All-Star 
 Danny Walton (1965)
 Don Wilson (1965) MLB All-Star ; 2 x No-Hitters; Died age 29
 Larry Brown (1958)
 Chuck Hiller (1957)
 Walt Bond (1957)
 Buddy Kerr (1956, Player/MGR)
 Felipe Alou (1956) 3 x MLB All-Star ;1994 NL Manager of the Year
 Julio Navarro (1955–56)
 Bama Rowell (1953–54)
 Pep Rambert (1952, MGR)

References

External links
Baseball Reference

Defunct minor league baseball teams
Defunct Florida State League teams
Cleveland Guardians minor league affiliates
Houston Astros minor league affiliates
New York Giants minor league affiliates
Defunct baseball teams in Florida
1951 establishments in Florida
1958 disestablishments in Florida
1965 establishments in Florida
1972 disestablishments in Florida
1977 establishments in Florida
1977 disestablishments in Florida
Baseball teams disestablished in 1977
Baseball teams established in 1951